The 1973–74 Athenian League season was the 51st in the history of Athenian League. The league consisted of 34 teams.

Division One

The previous season Premier Division changed name to Division One before this season.
The division featured 10 new teams:
 8 promoted from last season's old Division One:
 Grays Athletic  (3rd)
 Hounslow  (4th)
 Eastbourne United  (7th)
 Letchworth Town  (8th)
 Marlow  (9th)
 Edmonton  (11th)
 Herne Bay  (13th)
 Worthing  (14th)
 2 promoted from last season's old Division Two:
 Ruislip Manor (1st)
 Ware (3rd)

League table

Division Two

The previous season Division One changed name to Division Two before this season.
The division featured 14 new teams:
 10 promoted from last season's old Division Two:
 Leyton  (4th)
 Edgware  (5th)
 Rainham Town  (6th)
 Uxbridge  (7th)
 Addlestone  (8th)
 Harrow Borough  (9th)
 Hemel Hempstead  (10th)
 Windsor & Eton  (11th)
 Eastbourne Town  (12th)
 Wingate  (14th)
 4 joined the division:
 Alton Town, from Hampshire League
 Faversham Town, from Metropolitan–London League
 Molesey, from Spartan League
 Feltham, from Spartan League

League table

References

1973–74 in English football leagues
Athenian League